For Men Only (Spanish: Sólo para hombres) is a 1960 Spanish historical comedy film directed by Fernando Fernán Gómez, and starring Analía Gadé, Fernán Gómez, and Elvira Quintillá. In 1895, a woman goes to work as an official at the Ministry of Public Works, to the shock of her family.

Partial cast
 Analía Gadé as Flora Sandoval
 Fernando Fernán Gómez as Pablo Meléndez
 Elvira Quintillá as Felisa
 Juan Calvo as Don Claudio
 Manuel Alexandre as Manolo Estévez
 Joaquín Roa as José
 Rosario García Ortega as Matilde
 Erasmo Pascual as Justo Hernández de la Berquera
 Ángela Bravo as Cecilia

References

Bibliography 
 Bentley, Bernard. A Companion to Spanish Cinema. Boydell & Brewer, 2008.

External links 
 

1960s historical comedy films
Spanish historical comedy films
1961 films
1960s Spanish-language films
Films directed by Fernando Fernán Gómez
Films set in the 1890s
Films produced by Ricardo Sanz
1960s Spanish films